Andrew John Julian Bartlett (born 4 August 1964) is an Australian politician, social worker, academic, and social campaigner who served as a Senator for Queensland from 1997 to 2008 and from 2017 to 2018. He represented the Australian Democrats in his first stint in the Senate, including as party leader from 2002 to 2004 and deputy leader from 2004 to 2008. In November 2017, he returned to the Senate as a member of the Australian Greens, replacing Larissa Waters after her disqualification during the parliamentary eligibility crisis. He resigned from the Senate in August 2018 in an unsuccessful attempt to win the House of Representatives seat of Brisbane, allowing Waters to fill his seat in advance of the 2019 election.

Early life and background
Bartlett was born in Brisbane, where he has lived all his life. He is of Irish, Swiss, English and Greek origins – his great-great-grandfather, who is claimed to be the first Greek settler in Australia, arrived in Adelaide in 1840.

Political career

Entry into politics
Bartlett has campaigned for gay rights. In 2004, he cried in the Senate chamber over a proposed law to define marriage as between a man and a woman, which he called an "absolute disgrace".

Departure from the Democrats and Greens candidacy
Following the 2004 election, Bartlett did not re-contest the leadership, instead taking on the deputy leadership under Lyn Allison. Bartlett was defeated at the 2007 election, polling only 1.88% of the primary vote in Queensland. The Democrat vote was even lower in other states, and the party lost all its remaining Senate seats. He left the Senate at the expiration of his term in June 2008.

In November 2009, Greens leader Bob Brown announced that Bartlett would contest the lower house seat of Brisbane at the 2010 federal election as a candidate for the Australian Greens. Bartlett came third in the seat in the 2010 election, gaining 21.3% of the vote with a swing to the Greens of just over 10%.

In May 2012, Bartlett ran for the Lord Mayoralty of Brisbane for the Greens, receiving 10.7% of the primary vote, a 2.3% increase on the previous election.

In 2015, years after the Democrats' parliamentary oblivion, the party was deregistered by the Australian Electoral Commission. Speaking as a former Democrats leader, Bartlett reflected that the party's support of the Howard Government's introduction of the GST was "politically catastrophic", but the "last straw" for the party was the demise of Stott Despoja as leader in 2002:

Bartlett was again endorsed by the Greens as a Senate candidate for Queensland at the 2016 federal election. While he did not meet the quota for election, his colleague Senator Larissa Waters resigned her position on 18 July 2017 after discovering she held dual Australian and Canadian citizenship. She was ruled ineligible on 27 October 2017. As the second person on the 2016 Australian Greens Senate ticket, he replaced her after a recount. After his election was announced on 10 November, Bartlett was sworn in as a Senator for Queensland on 12 November 2017. Despite stirrings of a pre-selection showdown between himself and Waters for the next Senate election, Bartlett announced on 9 February 2018 that he would not seek to remain in the Senate, opting to seek pre-selection for the Queensland seat of Brisbane in the House of Representatives instead. On 16 June 2018, Bartlett announced that he would resign from the Senate at the end of August, to be replaced by Waters. The resignation was formally submitted to the Senate President Scott Ryan on 27 August 2018.

As announced, Bartlett contested the Division of Brisbane in the House of Representatives at the 2019 federal election receiving 22% of first preferences. Despite not winning the seat, he brought the Greens vote to its highest ever percentage in the Brisbane electorate, falling short of entering the two-party preferred vote behind Labor in second place, at 24.49%.

Bartlett contested the Electoral district of Clayfield in the Legislative Assembly of Queensland at the 2020 Queensland state election and received 17.61% of the vote.

Personal life
Bartlett is active on animal rights and human rights issues. After departing parliament, Bartlett took up a position as a part-time Research Fellow with the Migration Law Program at the Australian National University.

Bartlett has since returned to being an announcer at 4ZZZ, and was also Chair of the Board of Directors of 4ZZZ from 2014 until 2017. He occasionally writes pieces for websites such as Crikey, New Matilda, The Drum and Online Opinion. During Mental Health Week 2013, Bartlett wrote an article for the Courier-Mail about his being hospitalised for depression in 2012.

He has one daughter, Lillith.

References

External links
Andrew Bartlett's personal blog
Bartlett blog published by Crikey
A View From Australia, a blog by Bartlett published by Asian Correspondent
Hansard – Andrew Bartlett response to Marriage Act Amendment
"Mauled by a wild MP", 6 December 2003, Herald Sun (mirrored)
Andrew Bartlett interview – The new Senate, the Democrats and blogging, 9 August 2005, Vibewire.net

1964 births
Living people
Australian Democrats members of the Parliament of Australia
Australian Greens members of the Parliament of Australia
Australian Greens candidates
Australian people of English descent
Australian people of Greek descent
Australian people of Irish descent
Australian people of Swiss descent
Members of the Australian Senate
Members of the Australian Senate for Queensland
Politicians from Brisbane
Australian bloggers
Australian social workers
University of Queensland alumni
Articles containing video clips
Leaders of the Australian Democrats
21st-century Australian politicians
20th-century Australian politicians